New Concord Historic District is a national historic district located at New Concord in Columbia County, New York.  The district includes 31 contributing buildings, one contributing site, and eight contributing structures. It encompasses mostly domestic properties and related outbuildings, most all of frame construction and the majority built in the early- to mid-19th century.

It was listed on the National Register of Historic Places in 2010.

References

External links
All of the following are located in New Concord, Columbia County, NY:

Historic districts on the National Register of Historic Places in New York (state)
Houses on the National Register of Historic Places in New York (state)
Historic districts in Columbia County, New York
Houses in Columbia County, New York
National Register of Historic Places in Columbia County, New York